Ammar Ahmed (born 3 July 1988) is a Swedish professional footballer who plays as a midfielder for Assyriska United.

Career
Ahmed was born in Ljungby, Sweden, and played youth football with Fisksätra IF, Järla IF and AIK Ungdom, where he was given a "Player of the Year"-award in 2006. His professional career started with Väsby United in 2007 and after one year he moved to Värmdö IF and later to Dalkurd FF in 2011. After two years at Dalkurd FF he moved further up the league system to Östersunds FK in 2013, to play there for two more years, before moving up to the Swedish top tier, Allsvenskan, when signing for Åtvidabergs FF for the 2015 season.

Ahmed left Dalkurd FF at the end of 2018, where he played since January 2017.

Personal life

Ahmed was born in Ljungby, Sweden to Eritrean parents.

Career statistics

Honours

Individual 
 AIK Ungdom Player of the Year: 2006

See also 
 2015 Allsvenskan
 Åtvidabergs FF

References

External links 

 
 

1988 births
Association football midfielders
Allsvenskan players
Superettan players
Swedish footballers
Living people
Värmdö IF players
Dalkurd FF players
Östersunds FK players
Åtvidabergs FF players
Syrianska FC players
Östers IF players
Swedish people of Eritrean descent
Swedish sportspeople of African descent
People from Ljungby Municipality
Sportspeople from Kronoberg County